The term "Radio Free" is prefixed to several radio stations which were set up by United States Central Intelligence Agency to deliver news to countries strategically important to the foreign relations of the United States. The official stations are:
 Radio Free Afghanistan
 Radio Free Asia
 Radio Free Europe
 Radio Free Iraq
 Radio Free Syria

The term is also applied to other local radio and internet radio stations, such as:
 Free Radio San Diego
 Radio Free Brighton
 Radio Free Brooklyn
 Radio Free Chosun
 Radio Free Dixie
 Radio Free Georgia
 Radio Free Hawaii
 Radio Free Nashville
 Radio Free Queen City
 Radio Free Redoubt
 Radio Free Santa Fe
 Radio Free Taos
 Radio Free Scotland
 Radio Free Vietnam
 Radio Free Virgin

The term has also been applied to subjects that are not radio shows:
 Radio Free America
 Radio Free Albemuth
 Radio Free Roscoe - a teen comedy-drama sitcom, which has a fictional radio show of the same name
 Radio Free Vestibule
 Radio Free Zion
 Radio Free Wasteland, one of the two major radio stations in the video game Fallout 3.
 Radio Free Kyrat, one of the two radio stations in the video game Far Cry 4.
 "Radio Free Zerg," a secret music track in the computer game StarCraft: Brood War.